Marlston-cum-Lache is a former civil parish, now in the parishes of Dodleston and Eaton and Eccleston, in the Cheshire West and Chester district and ceremonial county of Cheshire in England. In 2001 it had a population of 112, increasing to 166 at the 2011 Census. Marlston cum Lache is served by the A483 road which is the main road to Chester. The civil parish was abolished in 2015 and became part of Dodleston and Eaton and Eccleston.

"Cum" in its name is Latin for "with".

See also

Listed buildings in Marlston-cum-Lache

References

External links

Former civil parishes in Cheshire
Cheshire West and Chester